The 2012–13 football season was the 47th Honduran Liga Nacional edition, since its establishment in 1965.  The season was divided into two tournaments (Apertura and Clausura) and determined the 61st and 62nd national champions.  The campaign began on 28 July 2012, and ended in May 2013. Club Deportivo Olimpia was the reigning champions after winning in 2011–12.

2012–13 teams
On 3 June 2012, C.D. Real Sociedad obtained the promotion to the Liga Nacional as winner of the 2011–12 Liga de Ascenso. Platense F.C. which had been relegated last season, bought C.D. Necaxa's franchise and will play in first division.

 Atlético Choloma
 Deportes Savio
 C.D. Marathón
 C.D. Motagua
 C.D. Olimpia
 Platense F.C.
 Real C.D. España
 C.D. Real Sociedad
 C.D. Victoria
 C.D.S. Vida

Apertura
The fixtures for the Apertura tournament were announced on 4 July; with the results Real C.D. España 1–0 C.D. Real Sociedad and Atlético Choloma 4–2 C.D.S. Vida, the tournament opened fire on 28 July. On rounds 2 and 3, Vida included midfielder Luis Jaramillo on their lineups despite being ineligible to play; on 12 September, the Northern Disciplinary Commission made the decision to award both matches to Real España and Victoria 3–0.

On 28 October, Club Deportivo Olimpia became the first team to secure a spot for the postseason, after defeating Platense F.C. 0–1 at Estadio Excélsior in Puerto Cortés. C.D. Victoria also qualified along Olimpia directly to the semifinals finishing second. On the other hand, C.D. Motagua–Real España and C.D. Marathón–Atlético Choloma had to play a playoff round.

The semifinal encounters were settled on 21 November, as Motagua and Atlético Choloma defeated Real España and Marathón respectively.  Motagua crushed Real España with a 7–3 on aggregate. Meanwhile, Atlético Choloma dispatched Marathón after a 2–2 aggregated score but with more away goals scored.

Once in the semifinals, Olimpia got rid of Atlético Choloma with a 2–1 aggregate, meanwhile Victoria and Motagua finished with a 3–3 global score, however, Victoria advanced thanks to a better regular season finish over Motagua.  With their success in the semifinals, Olimpia and Victoria re-encountered each other in a final for the third time in history, having won one each in the previous two.  The first match in La Ceiba ended with a scoreless tie; but in the second leg, Olimpia had no mercy over Victoria and won its third consecutive title with an overwhelming 4–0.

Regular season

Standings

Results
 As of 11 November 2012

 Originally Vida 1–0 Real España and Victoria 1–2 Vida. Due to the illegal participation of Vida's midfielder Luis Jaramillo in both matches, Real España and Victoria were granted each a 3–0 win.

Final round

Second round

Motagua vs Real España

 Motagua won 7–3 on aggregate score.

Marathón vs Atlético Choloma

 Marathón 2–2 Atlético Choloma on aggregate score; Atlético Choloma advanced on away goals.

Semifinals

Olimpia vs Atlético Choloma

 Olimpia won 2–1 on aggregate score.

Victoria vs Motagua

 Victoria 3–3 Motagua on aggregate score. Victoria advanced on better regular season performance.

Final

Olimpia vs Victoria

 Olimpia won 4–0 on aggregate score.

Top goalscorers
 As of 16 December 2012
 10 goals:

  Roger Rojas (Olimpia)

 8 goals:

  Óscar Torlacoff (Atlético Choloma)
  Aldo Oviedo (Atlético Choloma)

 7 goals:

  Mauricio Copete (Victoria)
  Jonatan Hansen (Real España)

 5 goals:

  Osnaldo Hernández (Real Sociedad)
  Shannon Welcome (Vida)
  Mitchel Brown (Marathón)
  Román Castillo (Deportes Savio)
  Elmer Zelaya (Vida)
  Osman Hernández (Atlético Choloma)

 4 goals:

  Juan Mejía (Olimpia)
  Amado Guevara (Motagua)
  Nery Medina (Motagua)
  Mario Berríos (Marathón)
  Georgie Welcome (Motagua)
  Ramiro Bruschi (Olimpia)
  Carlos Discua (Motagua)
  Leonardo Isaula (Atlético Choloma)

 3 goals:

  Elroy Smith (Vida)
  Charles Córdoba (Atlético Choloma)
  Carlos Mejía (Olimpia)
  Mariano Acevedo (Marathón)
  Julio Rodríguez (Real España)
  Johnny Leverón (Motagua)
  Rubén Licona (Victoria)
  César Oseguera (Motagua)
  Víctor Ortiz (Victoria)
  Jerry Palacios (Platense)
  Marco Vega (Marathón)
  Eddie Hernández (Motagua)

 2 goals:

  Ian Osorio (Platense)
  Marcelo Souza (Deportes Savio)
  Elkin González (Real Sociedad)
  Reynaldo Tilguath (Olimpia)
  Luis Lobo (Real España)
  Melvin Valladares (Motagua)
  Douglas Caetano (Olimpia)
  Javier Portillo (Olimpia)
  Stiven Jiménez (Platense)
  Aly Arriola (Deportes Savio)
  Carlos Morán (Motagua)
  Néstor Martínez (Vida)
  Cholby Martínez (Vida)
  Sebastián Rosano (Olimpia)
  Ever Alvarado (Real España)
  Jorge Lozano (Vida)
  Leonardo Benedith (Vida)
  Rony Flores (Marathón)
  Allan Lalín (Real España)
  Jonathan Reyes (Marathón)
  Wilmer Crisanto (Victoria)
  Juan García (Olimpia)

 1 goal:

  Johnny Barrios (Atlético Choloma)
  Marco Mejía (Deportes Savio)
  Júnior Sandoval (Marathón)
  Bayron Méndez (Platense)
  Jairo Puerto (Real España)
  Roby Norales (Motagua)
  José Meza (Marathón)
  John Beaumont (Deportes Savio)
  Luis Santamaría (Atlético Choloma)
  Luis Castro (Marathón)
  José Casildo (Platense)
  Edder Delgado (Real España)
  Romário Pinto (Deportes Savio)
  Alexander López (Olimpia)
  Brayan Beckeles (Olimpia)
  David Molina (Motagua)
  Eder Arias (Victoria)
  Johnny Palacios (Olimpia)
  Juan Cárcamo (Real Sociedad)
  Júnior Lacayo (Victoria)
  Selvin Tinoco (Deportes Savio)
  Luciano Emílio (Olimpia)
  Danilo Turcios (Real Sociedad)
  Porciano Ávila (Vida)
  Johny Galdámez (Deportes Savio)
  Carlos Valle (Real Sociedad)
  Mario Romero (Victoria)
  Christian Altamirano (Marathón)
  Francisco López (Platense)
  José Escalante (Olimpia)
  Óscar Fortín (Deportes Savio)
  Jesús Navas (Vida)
  Rony Morales (Platense)
  Jorge Campbell (Atlético Choloma)
  Jerry Díaz (Platense)
  Jorge Cardona (Platense)
  Samuel Córdova (Victoria)
  Jaime Rosales (Platense)
  Salvador Peña (Real Sociedad)
  Irvin Reyna (Olimpia)
  Félix Crisanto (Victoria)
  Marvin Sánchez (Atlético Choloma)
  Adán Ramírez (Real Sociedad)
  Rigoberto Padilla (Victoria)
  Walter Hernández (Platense)
  Bryan Castro (Deportes Savio)
  Sergio Bica (Real España)
  Chestyn Onofre (Vida)
  Rubén Matamoros (Real Sociedad)
  Orlin Peralta (Vida)
  Ney Costa (Vida)
  Hilder Colón (Real España)
  Gerson Rodas (Real España)

 1 own goal:

  Porciano Ávila (Vida)
  David Molina (Motagua)
  Wilson Güity (Atlético Choloma)
  Johnny Barrios (Atlético Choloma)

Clausura
The Clausura tournament started on 19 January 2013, the first game was played between locals C.D. Marathón and Platense F.C. at Estadio Yankel Rosenthal.  The regular season ended on 20 April 2013.  C.D. Olimpia and C.D. Real Sociedad qualified directly to the semifinals after finishing 1st and 2nd respectively. The playoffs were paired with C.D. Victoria facing Deportes Savio and Marathón vs Platense.

Regular season

Standings

Results
 As of 20 April 2013

Final round

Second round

Victoria vs Deportes Savio

 Victoria won 3–2 on aggregate score.

Marathón vs Platense

 Platense won 4–2 on aggregate score.

Semifinals

Olimpia vs Platense

 Olimpia 0–0 Platense on aggregate score; Olimpia advanced on better regular season performance.

Real Sociedad vs Victoria

 Real Sociedad won 5–2 on aggregate score.

Final

Olimpia vs Real Sociedad

 Olimpia won 2–1 on aggregate score.

Top goalscorers
 As of 19 May 2013
 12 goals:

  Rony Martínez (Real Sociedad)

 11 goals:

  Javier Estupiñán (Platense)

 9 goals:

  Claudio Cardozo (Real España)
  Roger Rojas (Olimpia)

 6 goals:

  Óscar Torlacoff (Atlético Choloma)
  Júnior Lacayo (Victoria)
  Diego Reyes (Real Sociedad)

 5 goals:

  Jocimar Nascimento (Motagua)
  Romário Pinto (Deportes Savio)
  Rony Flores (Marathón)
  Léster Blanco (Marathón)
  Luis Ramírez (Deportes Savio)

 4 goals:

  Ramiro Bruschi (Olimpia)
  Víctor Ortiz (Victoria)
  Santiago Minella (Deportes Savio)
  Melvin Valladares (Motagua)
  Shannon Welcome (Vida)
  Emil Martínez (Marathón)
  Eddie Hernández (Motagua)

 3 goals:

  Roby Norales (Motagua)
  Mariano Acevedo (Marathón)
  Osman Hernández (Atlético Choloma)
  Douglas Caetano (Olimpia)
  Walter Martínez (Vida)
  Osman Melgares (Real Sociedad)
  Wilmer Crisanto (Victoria)
  Francisco Benítez (Deportes Savio)

 2 goals:

  Marco Vega (Marathón)
  Efraín López (Real Sociedad)
  Víctor Mena (Atlético Choloma)
  Amado Guevara (Motagua)
  Manuel Mosquera (Victoria)
  Fábio de Souza (Olimpia)
  Luis Castro (Marathón)
  Jorge Cardona (Platense)
  Leonardo Isaula (Atlético Choloma)
  Román Castillo (Vida)
  Alexander López (Olimpia)
  Roy Posas (Atlético Choloma)
  Jerrick Díaz (Platense)
  Rubén Rivera (Victoria)
  Juan Montes (Platense)
  Brayan Martínez (Victoria)
  Francisco López (Platense)
  Jonatan Hansen (Real España)
  Carlos Discua (Motagua)
  Maynor Cabrera (Deportes Savio)
  Julio de León (Real Sociedad)
  Romell Quioto (Vida)
  Arnold Peralta (Vida)

 1 goal:

  Randy Diamond (Marathón)
  Wilson Güity (Real Sociedad)
  Víctor Zúniga (Platense)
  Aly Arriola (Deportes Savio)
  Félix Crisanto (Victoria)
  Ozzie Bodden (Victoria)
  Clayvin Zúniga (Deportes Savio)
  Marlon Peña (Real España)
  Carlos Morán (Motagua)
  Óscar García (Atlético Choloma)
  Ángel Tejada (Atlético Choloma)
  Víctor Moncada (Atlético Choloma)
  Denis Suazo (Victoria)
  Jairo Róchez (Victoria)
  Giovanni Lazo (Deportes Savio)
  Júnior Sandoval (Marathón)
  Orvin Paz (Atlético Choloma)
  Elkin González (Real Sociedad)
  Ángel Pineda (Deportes Savio)
  Abner Méndez (Atlético Choloma)
  Miguel Castillo (Real España)
  Walter Hernández (Platense)
  Uberdy García (Atlético Choloma)
  Edgar Flores (Victoria)
  John Beaumont (Platense)
  Franco Güity (Real España)
  Nery Medina (Motagua)
  Carlos Mejía (Olimpia)
  Sergio Peña (Real Sociedad)
  Mauricio Castro (Atlético Choloma)
  Bryan Róchez (Real España)
  Selvin Tinoco (Deportes Savio)
  Henry Clark (Real Sociedad)
  Marvin Barrios (Motagua)
  Carlos Gutiérrez (Olimpia)
  Bayron Méndez (Platense)
  Alfredo Mejía (Motagua)
  Christian Altamirano (Marathón)
  Mario Berríos (Marathón)
  Luis Guzmán (Atlético Choloma)
  Héctor García (Deportes Savio)
  Jorge Lozano (Vida)
  Edder Delgado (Real España)
  Dicktmar Hernández (Victoria)
  Julio Rodríguez (Real España)
  Luis Santamaría (Atlético Choloma)
  Giancarlo Maldonado (Platense)
  Omar Elvir (Motagua)
  Juan Mejía (Olimpia)
  Bani Lozano (Platense)
  Rubén Licona (Victoria)
  Juan García (Olimpia)
  Georgie Welcome (Motagua)
  Brayan Beckeles (Olimpia)

 1 own goal:

  Mario Chávez (Vida)
  Nixon Duarte (Platense)
  José Velásquez (Victoria)
  Júnior Izaguirre (Motagua)
  Óscar García (Atlético Choloma)
  Wilfredo Barahona (Real España)
  César Oseguera (Motagua)
  Chestyn Onofre (Vida)
  Ian Osorio (Platense)
  Julio Suazo (Victoria)
  Henry Figueroa (Motagua)

Aggregate table
Relegation was determined by the aggregated table of both Apertura and Clausura tournaments.  On 20 April 2013, Atlético Choloma was relegated to the Liga de Ascenso after reaching 38 points, two less than C.D.S. Vida.

References

External links
 Liga Nacional de Fútbol Profesional (Official website)

Liga Nacional de Fútbol Profesional de Honduras seasons
1
Honduras